Burlington Airport may refer to:

Canada
 Burlington Executive Airport, Ontario, Canada (ICAO: CZBA)

United States
 Burlington International Airport, Vermont, United States (ICAO: KBTV)
 Burlington Municipal Airport (Wisconsin), United States
 Burlington-Alamance Regional Airport, North Carolina, United States (ICAO: KBUY)
 Southeast Iowa Regional Airport, Iowa, United States (ICAO: KBRL)
 Burlington Municipal Airport (Massachusetts), a former airport in the United States